Anne Tamar-Mattis is an American attorney, human rights advocate, and founder of interACT (formerly Advocates for Informed Choice). She currently serves as interACT's Legal Director.

Career 
Anne Tamar-Mattis spent six years as the Director of the National Youth Talkline at Lavender Youth Recreation & Information Center, a national peer-support line for LGBTQ youth. She became the first Program Director for the San Francisco LGBT Community Center in 2001. In 2003 she took a hiatus to attend law school and graduated from the University of California, Berkeley School of Law in 2006.

Tamar-Mattis founded interACT with the support of fellowships from Equal Justice Works (2006) and Echoing Green (2008). She has been an adjunct professor at the University of California, Berkeley School of Law since 2008 where she teaches Sexual Orientation & the Law.

Selected bibliography 
Selected publications include:

Awards and recognition

In 2010, Anne Tamar-Mattis was recognized as an Unsung Hero by KQED. 2011 saw her elected to the American Law Institute, and in 2012 Anne was awarded the Barbara Nachtrieb Armstrong Award for Outstanding Advocacy on Behalf of Social Justice for Women.

Personal life
Tamar-Mattis lives with her partner, intersex activist and medical doctor, Suegee Tamar-Mattis. They are the parents of two children. In 2012, they appeared in the documentary feature, Intersexion.

References

External links
 Website of interACT

Intersex rights activists
Living people
UC Berkeley School of Law alumni
UC Berkeley School of Law faculty
Year of birth missing (living people)
Place of birth missing (living people)
Intersex rights in the United States